Vaas may refer to:
Places
 Vaas, Sarthe, a town in western France
People
 Chaminda Vaas (born 1974), Sri Lankan cricketer
 Peter Vaas (born 1952), American football player and coach
 Vincent Vaas (1922 - 2004), Sri Lankan actor
Fictional characters
 Vaas Montenegro, a character from the Far Cry video game series